The Hainesport Township School District is a community public school district that serves students in pre-kindergarten through eighth grade from Hainesport Township, in Burlington County, New Jersey, United States.

As of the 2020–21 school year, the district, comprised of one school, had an enrollment of 519 students and 55.4 classroom teachers (on an FTE basis), for a student–teacher ratio of 9.4:1.

The district is classified by the New Jersey Department of Education as being in District Factor Group "FG", the fourth-highest of eight groupings. District Factor Groups organize districts statewide to allow comparison by common socioeconomic characteristics of the local districts. From lowest socioeconomic status to highest, the categories are A, B, CD, DE, FG, GH, I and J.

For ninth through twelfth grades, public school students attend the Rancocas Valley Regional High School, a comprehensive regional public high school serving students from five communities encompassing approximately : Eastampton Township, Hainesport Township, Lumberton Township, Mount Holly Township and Westampton Township. As of the 2020–21 school year, the high school had an enrollment of 2,069 students and 139.6 classroom teachers (on an FTE basis), for a student–teacher ratio of 14.8:1. The school is located in Mount Holly Township.

School
Hainesport School served a total of 594 students in grades PreK-8 in the 2020–21 school year.
Lauren M. Salls, Principal for Grades PreK-4 / Director of Special Services 
Thomas J. Simonet, Principal for Grades 5-8 / Director of Curriculum & Instruction

Administration
Core members of the district's administration are:
Joseph R. Corn, Superintendent
Robert J. Kraft, Business Administrator / Board Secretary

Board of education
The district's board of education has nine members who set policy and oversee the fiscal and educational operation of the district through its administration. As a Type II school district, the board's trustees are elected directly by voters to serve three-year terms of office on a staggered basis, with three seats up for election each year held (since 2012) as part of the November general election. The board appoints a superintendent to oversee the district's day-to-day operations and a business administrator to supervise the business functions of the district.

References

External links
Hainesport Township School District

School Data for the Hainesport Township School District, National Center for Education Statistics

Hainesport Township, New Jersey
New Jersey District Factor Group FG
School districts in Burlington County, New Jersey
Public K–8 schools in New Jersey